Victoria Beckham: Coming to America was a 2007 one-hour American TV special that featured British former Spice Girl Victoria Beckham moving to the United States where her husband, David Beckham, began his career playing soccer for LA Galaxy of the MLS.

Summary
The programme was part factual and part a scripted spoof on documentaries such as Being Victoria Beckham and other shows featuring the Beckhams. Parts of the spoof element featured Victoria being mean to her personal assistant, played by Renee Gauthier. 

Produced by 19 Entertainment (Simon Fuller's company that handles the careers of David and Victoria Beckham), what eventually ended up as a one-hour show on NBC was originally supposed to be six half-hour episodes shown weekly as agreed upon by Fuller and NBC months before the scheduled arrival of the Beckhams to the US. However, NBC soon cooled on the idea and unilaterally decided to move the episodes to its lower-profile sister network Bravo on basic cable. The move made Fuller irate, but he only succeeded in getting NBC to reach a compromise: the show would air as a one-hour, stand-alone broadcast on NBC on July 16, 2007, and if it managed to pull in good enough ratings, more episodes would follow. Though it won its time slot on Monday in the usually slow summer TV season, the show got a tepid 2.2 rating with 5.1 million total viewers in the US, falling well short of the numbers required to make NBC interested in ordering additional episodes.

In addition to NBC, the show also aired the same day on CTV in Canada. It premiered on ITV in Beckham's native United Kingdom and the Nine Network in Australia on July 17, 2007.

References

External links

2007 American television series debuts
2007 American television series endings
Television series by Universal Television
NBC television specials
Victoria Beckham